Almanzora is a comarca in the province of Almería, Andalusia, Spain. It contains the following municipalities:

 Albanchez
 Albox
 Alcóntar
 Arboleas
 Armuña de Almanzora
 Bacares
 Bayarque
 Cantoria
 Chercos
 Cóbdar
 Fines
 Laroya
 Líjar
 Lúcar
 Macael
 Olula del Río
 Oria
 Partaloa
 Purchena
 Serón
 Sierro
 Somontín
 Suflí
 Taberno
 Tíjola
 Urrácal
 Zurgena

References

Comarcas of Andalusia
Geography of the Province of Almería